Friedrich "Fritz" Karl Otto Wunderlich (26 September 1930 – 17 September 1966) was a German lyric tenor, famed for his singing of the Mozart repertory and various lieder. He died in an accident aged 35.

Biography
Wunderlich was born in Kusel in the Palatinate, Germany. His mother was a violinist and his father was a choirmaster. For a short time, the family kept the inn "Emrichs Bräustübl" (Emrich's Brewing Cottage). Fritz's father lost his job due to pressure imposed upon him by local Nazis, in addition to suffering from a severe battlefield injury. He died by suicide when Fritz was five years old.

Fritz mastered several instruments while still a schoolboy and when he entered the Hochschule für Musik Freiburg in 1950, his principal study was the horn. Then the singing teacher  discovered and trained his voice.

Wunderlich was soon noted as a brilliant young tenor, especially in Mozartian roles, but he later expanded his reach to the full range of the lyric tenor repertoire.

He occasionally sang and recorded minor Wagner roles such as the steersman in Der fliegende Holländer, Walther von der Vogelweide in Tannhäuser, and the shepherd in Tristan und Isolde. He sang and recorded the role of the Italian Tenor in Der Rosenkavalier.

Recordings

It was the fashion during Wunderlich's career for many German theatres to perform operas in the local rather than original language. Therefore, most of his recordings of the Italian operatic repertoire are sung in German, including Verdi's La traviata and Rossini's The Barber of Seville. (He sang his recording of the Verdi Requiem in distinctly Germanic Latin.) Wunderlich achieved the highest distinction within the German repertory. Of special importance is the 1964 recording of Mozart's The Magic Flute, conducted by Karl Böhm, in which Wunderlich gave a critically acclaimed performance as Tamino, opposite sopranos Evelyn Lear as Pamina and Roberta Peters as the Queen of the Night and baritone Dietrich Fischer-Dieskau in the role of Papageno. There is also a live performance of The Magic Flute recorded in 1960 at the Salzburg Festival, and several recordings as Belmonte in Die Entführung aus dem Serail. Recordings also exist of lesser-known Mozart operas such as Zaide and La finta giardiniera

Wunderlich's crystal-clear voice, exquisitely precise diction, and intelligent but passionate interpretation also led him to impressive renditions of the lieder cycles of Schubert and Schumann with pianist Hubert Giesen, who was also his artistic mentor. His famous recording of Schumann's Dichterliebe remains a gold standard of this genre. Many tenors since have emulated Wunderlich's interpretation of this cycle.

Another notable recording he left is J. S. Bach's Christmas Oratorio, with fellow singers Gundula Janowitz, Christa Ludwig, and Franz Crass, conducted by Karl Richter. Also he is the tenor on Herbert von Karajan's recording of Beethoven's Missa Solemnis, with Gundula Janowitz, Christa Ludwig, and Walter Berry. He recorded an album of pre-Bach sacred songs, featuring music of Schütz, Telemann, Buxtehude, and other less well-known composers. With Christa Ludwig he recorded Gustav Mahler's Das Lied von der Erde with the Philharmonia Orchestra under Otto Klemperer.

At the time of his death, he had been recording Haydn's The Creation, with the Berlin Philharmonic and the Wiener Singverein under Herbert von Karajan with other soloists Christa Ludwig, Gundula Janowitz, Walter Berry and Fischer-Dieskau. Wunderlich had completed recording his arias, but Werner Krenn was hired to record the recitatives. Several recorded live performances of Wunderlich singing the whole part, under Karajan, survive.

Numerous anthology albums of him singing arias from opera and operetta are available.

Available videos include a full-length performance (in German) as Count Almaviva in The Barber of Seville (with Hermann Prey, Erika Köth and Hans Hotter), and a recital of operatic arias.

Accidental death
Wunderlich sang at the 1966 Salzburg Festival, but two weeks later his career was cut short by an accident while he was on a hunting holiday. He fell from a stairway in a friend's country house in Oberderdingen near Maulbronn owing to loosely tied shoes, fracturing his skull, and died in the University Clinic of Heidelberg just days before his 36th birthday. This occurred a few weeks before his planned Metropolitan Opera debut in New York City as Don Ottavio in Mozart's Don Giovanni. Wunderlich is buried in Munich's Waldfriedhof cemetery.

Notes

External links
Website of the Fritz Wunderlich Gesellschaft

Wunderlich fan's comprehensive website

1930 births
1966 deaths
German operatic tenors
Deutsche Grammophon artists
Lieder singers
Accidental deaths from falls
Accidental deaths in Germany
Hochschule für Musik Freiburg alumni
20th-century German male opera singers
People from Kusel (district)
Burials at Munich Waldfriedhof